Chinese Taipei national ice hockey team may refer to:
 Chinese Taipei men's national ice hockey team
 Chinese Taipei men's national junior ice hockey team
 Chinese Taipei men's national under-18 ice hockey team
 Chinese Taipei women's national ice hockey team